Leeuwenhoekiella palythoae  is a heterotrophic and strictly aerobic bacterium from the genus of Leeuwenhoekiella.

References

External links
Type strain of Leeuwenhoekiella palythoae at BacDive -  the Bacterial Diversity Metadatabase	

Flavobacteria
Bacteria described in 2009
Leeuwenhoekiella